Kerstin Andersdotter (1774–1852), known as Mor Kerstin i Stämmemand-Kinna ('Mother Kerstin of Stämmemand-Kinna'), was a Swedish textile industrialist. She was an important figure within the Swedish textile industry in the first half of the 19th century, managing a major cotton industry through the putting-out system in around the countryside of Kinna in Västergötland. In 1840, 80 percent of all cotton textiles sold from Sweden was sold from the Kinna area.

Life
She was born in the rural area of Kinna as the daughter of the wealthy farmer Anders Jonsson and Elin Larsdotter, and married in 1800 to the wealthy farmer Erik Andersson (1772–1813). Her husband was the owner of the farm Stämmemand in Kinna, hence her own soubriquet. She had five children: two sons (one surviving to adulthood) and three daughters.

Business
Both her father and her spouse were active as textile entrepreneurs within the putting-out system and her mother managed her own money lending business, and she was to follow all of their examples. In 1813, when she became a widow and thereby of legal majority (which made her business activity visible in official documentation), she took over the textile putting-out system manufacture business of both her father and her late spouse. She also started banking by money lending. This was at a point in time when the putting-out system had its breakthrough from small scale business to large scale industrial enterprises, and she was one example of those who developed her manufacture to a major business industry. The Kinna area was furthermore the center of the Swedish cotton industry, and she became one of the major manufacturers with thousands of home weavers in her employ. She continued her business activity until her death, for almost forty years. 

She is known as the mother of the cotton industrialist  (1801–1866), but he did in fact not inherit her business (he founded his own during her lifetime), her business enterprise was instead inherited by one of her daughters and her son-in-law. 

In 1842, she was awarded with a golden chain from King Charles XIV John of Sweden as a recognition for her industrial enterprise within the Swedish cotton industry as well as for encouraging the public diligence within the household with her diligence and personal example.

Legacy
After her death, her farm became a local memorial. A square, as well as a road in Kinna, have been named after her.

References 

1774 births
1852 deaths
19th-century Swedish businesswomen
19th-century Swedish businesspeople